At least three warships of Japan have borne the name Shikinami:

 , launched in 1893 as the Russian Gaidamak. She was scuttled at Port Arthur but was raised and commissioned by Japan in 1905. She was stricken about 1911
 , a  launched in 1929 and sunk in 1944
 , an  launched in 1957 and stricken in 1987

Japanese Navy ship names
Imperial Japanese Navy ship names